Merthyr Tydfil County Borough Council is the governing body for Merthyr Tydfil County Borough, one of the Principal Areas of Wales.

History
The parish of Merthyr Tydfil was governed by a local board from 1850 until 1894, when it was replaced by an urban district council. The urban district was incorporated as a borough in 1905, creating the first Merthyr Tydfil Borough Council. In 1908 it became a county borough, making it independent from Glamorgan County Council. It retained county borough status until 1974, when there were significant changes to local government under the Local Government Act 1972. From 1974 until 1996, Merthyr Tydfil Borough Council was a lower-tier district council, with Mid Glamorgan County Council providing county-level services in the area. Since the abolition of Mid Glamorgan County Council in 1996, Merthyr Tydfil has again been a county borough.

Political control
The first election to the council following the Local Government Act 1972 was held in 1973, initially operating as a shadow authority before coming into its revised powers on 1 April 1974. Political control of the council since 1974 has been held by the following parties:

Lower-tier borough

County borough

Leadership
The leaders of the council since 2005 have been:

Current composition 
As of 5 May 2022:

Elections
Since 2017, elections have been held every five years:

Party with the most elected councillors in bold. Coalition agreements in notes column.

Premises

Until 1989 the council was based at Merthyr Tydfil Town Hall, which had been built between 1896 and 1898 for the old urban district council. In 1989 a new civic centre was built on Castle Street, which opened as the council's headquarters at the start of January 1990.

Electoral divisions

The county borough is divided into 11 electoral wards returning 30 councillors. Most of these wards are coterminous with communities (parishes) of the same name.

Bedlinog & Trelewis Community Council is the only community council in Merthyr Tydfil.

The following table lists council wards, communities and associated geographical areas.

c = Ward coterminous with community of the same name

See also
 List of electoral wards in Merthyr Tydfil County Borough

References

External links
Merthyr Tydfil County Borough Council

Politics of Merthyr Tydfil County Borough
Merthyr Tydfil